John Voll may refer to:
 John J. Voll, United States Air Force officer and World War II flying ace
 John Obert Voll, American scholar of Islam